María José Poves Novella (born March 16, 1978 in Zaragoza) is a Spanish race walker.

Achievements

References

External links
 

1978 births
Living people
Sportspeople from Zaragoza
Spanish female racewalkers
Athletes (track and field) at the 2008 Summer Olympics
Athletes (track and field) at the 2012 Summer Olympics
Olympic athletes of Spain
World Athletics Championships athletes for Spain
20th-century Spanish women
21st-century Spanish women